The River Annalee is a river in County Cavan, Ireland. The source of the river is Lough Sillan near Shercock from which it flows westwards through Lough Tacker, and south of Cootehill, until it reaches Butlersbridge. To the west of the village the river then flows through a series of lakes, before its confluence with the River Erne.

The  Bunnoe and Laragh Rivers are two main tributaries that join the river below Cootehill, where it is also joined by the Dromore River.

The Irish name for the river is Abhainn  na hEoghanach, which originates from the name of the historical district to the north of the river known as An Eoghanach, a district sometimes anglicised as Owenagh. The anglicised name of the river derives from one of the townlands through which it flows, namely Annaghlee (Eanach Lao).

Fishing is quite popular at Deredis near Butlersbridge and upstream of Cootehill in the stretch below Knappagh Bridge. Catches include Perch, Pike, Roach and Bream with Trout to over 3 pounds being reported.

The flow or discharge of the river is measured in its lower reaches at Butlersbridge, river levels are also measured at Rathkenny and Derryheen Bridge.

In September 1895 Charles Joseph Fay, former Home Rule League MP for Cavan, drowned in the River Annalee. It is believed that he lost his way in the dark, traveling home from Cootehill fair.

References

Rivers of County Cavan